Ghotki is a city in Sindh, Pakistan.

Ghotki may also refer to:
 
Ghotki District, an administrative unit of Sindh
Ghotki railway station, the city's railway station
2021 Ghotki rail crash, a rail train crash
Ghotki Taluka, a tehsil of Ghotki District

See also

Ghoti (disambiguation)